Belinsky District is an administrative and municipal district (raion), one of the twenty-seven in Penza Oblast, Russia. It is located in the west of the oblast. Its administrative center is the town of Belinsky. Population: 28,881 (2010 Census);  The population of the administrative center accounts for 29.7% of the district's total population.

References

Notes

Sources

 
Districts of Penza Oblast